Ángel García Cabezali (born 3 February 1993), sometimes known as just Ángel, is a Spanish professional footballer who plays as either a left back or a left winger for AEK Larnaca.

Club career
Born in Madrid, Ángel García joined Real Madrid's youth setup in 2003, after stints at Club Bonanza and Rozal Madrid CF. He made his senior debuts with the C-team in 2012, in Segunda División B.

On 7 August 2014, Ángel García moved to Real Valladolid, being assigned to the reserves also in the third division. On 9 September of the following year he made his first team debut, starting in a 2–1 away loss against Real Oviedo, for the season's Copa del Rey.

Ángel García made his Segunda División debut on 11 October 2015, starting and scoring his team's second in a 3–2 home loss against the same opponent. On 8 June 2016, he was definitely promoted to the main squad, and renewed his contract until 2018.

On 4 January 2018, Ángel García moved to fellow second division team Cultural y Deportiva Leonesa.

Ángel García signed with Polish club Wisła Płock on 30 January 2018.

Career statistics

References

External links

1993 births
Living people
Footballers from Madrid
Spanish footballers
Association football defenders
Association football wingers
Association football utility players
Segunda División players
Segunda División B players
Ekstraklasa players
Real Madrid C footballers
Real Valladolid Promesas players
Real Valladolid players
Cultural Leonesa footballers
Wisła Płock players
AEK Larnaca FC players